Boggut labeo or the minor carp (Labeo boggut) is an Asian freshwater fish of the family Cyprinidae. It is known from Pakistan, India and Bangladesh.

References 

 

Labeo
Cyprinid fish of Asia
Freshwater fish of India
Freshwater fish of Sri Lanka
Taxa named by William Henry Sykes
Fish described in 1839